Phrynops paranaensis is an extinct species of turtle from the Huayquerian Ituzaingó Formation of the Paraná Basin, Argentina, likely to be late Miocene in origin.

References

Chelidae
Extinct turtles
Prehistoric turtles of South America
Fossil taxa described in 1923